Rajko Pavlovec (15 January 1932 – 25 August 2013) was a Slovene professor of geology, specialist in paleontology, stratigraphy and regional geology.

In 1976, he won the Levstik Award for his book  (Karst) on the geology of the Karst.

Selected published works 

  (The Stratigraphic Development of the Early Tertiary in South Eastern Slovenia with Particular Regard to Nummulites and Asilinae), 1962
  (Istrian Nummulites With Special Regard to Phylogenesis and Palaeoecology), 1969
  (Karst), 1976
  (From the Lives of Continents), 1977

References 

Yugoslav geologists
Slovenian paleontologists
Levstik Award laureates
Writers from Ljubljana
1932 births
2013 deaths